Carles Mulet Garcia (born April 19, 1975 in Castellón de la Plana) is a Spanish politician and senator. He is a senator by appointment in the Senate of Spain representing the Valencian Parliament of Coalició Compromís. He was appointed into the Senate of Spain by the Valencian Parliament on July 23, 2015.

During the plenary session of the Senate on April 13, 2016, he became the first senator to speak in the Leonese language in a plenary session of the Senate of Spain.

References 

Living people
1975 births
Members of the 12th Senate of Spain
Members of the 13th Senate of Spain
Members of the 14th Senate of Spain